Hypercompe mus is a moth of the family Erebidae first described by Charles Oberthür in 1881. It is found in Paraguay and Brazil.

References

Hypercompe
Moths described in 1881